Ilie Theodoriu Năstase (born 19 July 1946) is a former World No. 1 Romanian tennis player. He was ranked world No. 1 in singles from 23 August 1973 to 2 June 1974, and was the first man to hold the top position on the computerized ATP rankings. Năstase is one of the 10 players in history who have won over 100 total ATP titles, with 64 in singles and 45 in doubles.

Năstase won seven major titles: two in singles, three in men's doubles and two in mixed doubles. He also won four Masters Grand Prix year-end championship titles and seven Grand Prix Super Series titles (1970–73), the precursors to the current Masters 1000. He was the first professional sports figure to sign an endorsement contract with Nike, doing so in 1972. Năstase wrote several novels in French in the 1980s, and was inducted into the International Tennis Hall of Fame in 1991.

Career

At the beginning of his career in 1966, Năstase traveled around the world competing with  Ion Țiriac. They represented Romania in the Davis Cup competition, being runners up in 1969, 1971, and 1972.

In singles, Năstase won his first tournament at Cannes on 16 April 1967. His first victories against top players happened in 1969 in Stockholm, where he defeated Tony Roche and Stan Smith.

Năstase became one of the best players in 1970, with many experts ranking him as the sixth-best player in the world at that time, behind the Australians Rod Laver, Ken Rosewall, John Newcombe, and Tony Roche and the American Arthur Ashe. Năstase's high ranking resulted from his success at the Italian Open in Rome and at the U.S. Indoor Open in Salisbury, Maryland. With Tiriac, Năstase won the men's doubles title at the French Open.

In 1971, Năstase was the runner-up at the French Open, where he lost the final in four sets to Jan Kodeš. In December, Năstase won his first Masters Grand Prix title, finishing in front of Stan Smith in a round robin competition.

In 1972, he became the No. 2 in the world, owing to his winning the US Open in a five-set final over Arthur Ashe. This tournament was the only event of the year in which all the best players participated. Two months before, at Wimbledon, Năstase narrowly lost to Stan Smith in an epic five-set final, one of the more exciting championship matches. In the Davis Cup, Năstase was undefeated in singles until losing to Stan Smith in the final played on clay in his native Bucharest. In December at the year-end tour finals, Năstase defeated Smith, winning his second consecutive Masters Grand Prix title.

In 1973, Năstase won 17 tournaments, including the French Open, a doubles title at Wimbledon, and a third Masters title. He was the world No. 1 in the ATP rankings that year. He also won the 'Martini and Rossi' Award, voted for by a panel of journalists and was ranked No. 1 by an international poll of 17 tennis writers, Tennis Magazine (U.S.), Bud Collins, Rino Tommasi and Rex Bellamy. In the Davis Cup, he won seven of eight singles rubbers. In matches against the other top players, Năstase was 1–0 against Newcombe and 1–1 against Smith. The Romanian won the French Open without dropping a set (a feat repeated by Björn Borg in 1978 and 1980 and by Rafael Nadal in 2008, 2010, 2017 and 2020), and he won the French Open (clay), Rome (clay) and Queen's Club (grass) in succession. Năstase was seeded No. 2 for Wimbledon 1973, behind the defending champion Stan Smith. When the newly formed ATP withdrew its players from the tournament following the suspension by the ITF of Yugoslav Nikola Pilić, only three ATP players (Năstase, Roger Taylor and Ray Keldie) defied the boycott and were fined by the ATP's disciplinary committee. Nastase was promoted to No. 1 seed for the players in the subsequently weakened field and publicly stated his support for the ATP action but insisted that as a serving captain, he was under orders from the Romanian army and government to compete and thus could not boycott the tournament. Some contemporary press speculation and later biographies have suggested Năstase contrived to lose his fourth-round match to American Sandy Mayer, but to have lost any earlier to a considerably less able player would have been too obvious. Năstase never has commented publicly on this speculation.

In 1974, he was the only player to qualify for both the WCT Finals and the Masters Grand Prix finals. Năstase played well in the Masters, in particular against Newcombe in the semifinals. (Năstase finished his career with a 4–1 record versus Newcombe, losing only their first match in 1969.) The Romanian, however, lost the final to Guillermo Vilas in five sets.

For the fifth consecutive year, Năstase reached the Masters Grand Prix final in 1975, where he defeated Björn Borg in three straight sets.

During the first half of 1976, Năstase won four tournaments (Atlanta WCT, Avis Challenge Cup WCT, US Open Indoor, and La Costa), and head-to-head, he led Connors 2–1, Vilas 1–0, Ashe 1–0, and Borg 2–0. Năstase did not enter the Australian Open, which was again avoided by most of the top players. Năstase was prevented from entering the French Open because he participated in World Team Tennis. In the second half of the year, third-seeded Nastase lost in straight sets to Borg in the men's singles final of Wimbledon and in the semifinals of the US Open. Năstase won three other tournaments during the second half of the year, the Pepsi Grand Slam, South Orange, and the four-man tournament of Caracas, Venezuela, in October (not to be confused with the Caracas WCT tournament in March), making seven tournament championships for the year. Năstase was the world No. 3, behind Connors and Borg.

In 1977, Năstase finished No. 9 in the ATP rankings. He was a quarterfinalist at the French Open and at Wimbledon (losing to Borg), and participated in the WCT Finals. During his quarterfinal match at Wimbledon Năstase had a row with umpire Jeremy Shales. Shales called him "Năstase" when asking him to move to the advantage court, "like a master speaks to a naughty schoolboy." (Năstase has also said Shales asked him to pick up a piece of paper that had blown onto the court, saying, "Năstase, pick up that paper.") Năstase angrily replied "You call me Mr. Năstase!". Since this incident, umpires have always used a courtesy title when addressing the players directly. Mr. Nastase later became the title of his autobiography.

He was still one of the 20 best players in 1978. At Wimbledon, he again reached the quarterfinals.

Năstase retired from the tour in October 1985 at the age of 39 after playing in the Grand Prix de Tennis de Toulouse, but he did play the challenger tournament at Dijon in June 1988.

Controversies
In October 1977 at the Raquette d'Or tournament, Năstase used a 'spaghetti string' (double-strung) racket to end Guillermo Vilas's 46-match winning streak. The racket was known for creating large amounts of top spin and unpredictable bounces. Vilas quit the match in protest of the racket. A few days later, the ATP banned the use of such racquets.

During the US Open in 1979, Năstase was defaulted from his match against John McEnroe. The umpire previously docked Năstase a point in third set and then a game in the fourth for arguing and stalling. A near-riot followed as the crowd disagreed with the umpire's decision, throwing beer cans and cups on court. The match was restarted, with the umpire being replaced, before McEnroe won.

In 1994 Năstase, Davis Cup captain of his country, was banned for an away match against Great Britain, for "'audible obscenities and constant abuse and intimidation of officials'" in a tie against South Africa.

In 2017, while captaining his country's Fed Cup team against Great Britain, Năstase was overheard commenting about Serena Williams' unborn child, and the 71-year-old asked Britain's Fed Cup captain Anne Keothavong for her room number while posing for photographers. Năstase previously made unfounded comments about Williams allegedly doping. Before Great Britain and Romania began their two-day World Group play-off, Năstase allegedly stormed in to the media centre to confront British journalists over the reporting of his comments the previous day. Năstase could only find Press Association tennis correspondent Eleanor Crook before launching into a tirade about the reporting.

During the second rubber, after the crowd had been told to respect the players, he said to match umpire Andreas Egli: "It's not the opera, what's your f****** problem?" He was ultimately ejected from the stadium for unsportsmanlike conduct. In a statement the International Tennis Federation (ITF) additionally confirmed that Năstase had his accreditation removed and would take no further part in the tie. The next day, the ITF provisionally suspended Năstase under the Fed Cup Regulations for a breach of the Fed Cup Welfare Policy, meaning that he was banned from the site of any ITF event. When Năstase was ejected from the stadium he met Crook again and, separated by a large number of security guards, verbally attacked her. The next day, despite being banned from the venue, Năstase reappeared and went to have lunch in the onsite restaurant. He additionally sent flowers to the British team. On 21 July 2017, he was suspended by the ITF until 2021.

Williams released a statement on social media branding the comments about her unborn child as racist, noting that it saddened her that we live in a society where these comments can be made. Năstase then apologised on social media regarding the comments he made about Williams, but made comments about Konta speaking to the umpire which upset him. In a further interview with the BBC, Năstase justified his comments to Konta, stating that he only abused her after being ejected from the court and did so as a fan rather than a captain. Năstase also said that he regretted his behaviour in the incident. Nastase was not invited to the French Open and Wimbledon following his suspension. The Madrid Open, however, invited Nastase to be part of the prizegiving ceremony, which was won by Simona Halep (another Romanian player). This was a move that was deemed irresponsible by the WTA, which had revoked Nastase's privileges while the ITF carried out its investigation.

Allegations of inappropriate behaviour included Pam Shriver claiming Năstase frequently asked in a joking manner if she was still a virgin. After about 30 occasions of this happening, Shriver asked him to stop asking that, which he did. Dominique Monami, captain of the Belgium team, then mentioned that Năstase had abused her in the round before the match with Great Britain. Monami later added that Năstase was abusive for two games during the match between Elise Mertens and Irina-Camelia Begu.

Playing style

Considered one of the more gifted tennis players in history, Năstase was noted for his ability to entertain, amusing spectators with his antics and mimicry. Even during a crucial phase of a match, he was likely to do something bizarre that would entertain the crowd.

One of the faster players, he is remembered for his magnificent lobs and retrieves. Năstase could apply a discomfiting spin to his shots, being an expert at putting the ball just beyond an opponent's reach. His greatest weakness was a fragile nervous system and erratic temperament.

Năstase pioneered a distinctive tennis shot, a backward, over-the-shoulder wrist-flick useful as a last resort in recovering lobs. Tennis writer Bud Collins dubbed the shot the "Bucharest Backfire" after Năstase.

According to The Independent, Năstase is best remembered for being one of the better players never to win the singles title at Wimbledon, for his tantrums, and his good looks.

Athletic distinctions
 Năstase has the all-time highest winning percentage (88%, 22 wins and only 3 losses) in the year ending tournaments (today ATP World Tour Finals) winning four times, in 1971, 1972, 1973 and 1975.
 He is one of the five tennis players (third place) in the world who won more than 100 pro titles (57 singles and 45 doubles) according to the Association of Tennis Professionals (ATP) website, though there are many titles that are not included in the ATP statistics. (see Career statistics section).
 Năstase was the first professional sports figure to sign an endorsement contract with Nike.

Awards and accolades
 Năstase was inducted into the International Tennis Hall of Fame in 1991.
 In March 2009, Năstase was made a knight of the France's Legion d'honneur, being acclaimed for his "impressive sporting career" and "the sense of spectacle" he created when playing.
 On 19 July 2016, his 70th birthday, Năstase received the Star of Romania, his country's highest civil award, for services to sport.

Books
Năstase has published two novels and at least one autobiography.
 Tie-Break (Tie-break, 1985), also published as Break Point
 The Net (Le filet, 1986)
 Mr Nastase: The Autobiography (Mr Năstase: Autobiografia, 2004)

Political career
He holds the rank of major general in the Romanian military. He entered Romanian politics in the 1990s, making an unsuccessful run for mayor of Bucharest in 1996. Elected to the Romanian Senate for a Bucharest seat in 2012, he initially sat for the Conservative Party (PC), then subsequently switching to the National Union for the Progress of Romania (UNPR) in July 2015 after the former party ceased to exist.

Personal life
Năstase has been married five times: his first wife was Dominique Grazia, a Belgian fashion model, whom he wed at the age of 26 and whom he was married to for 10 years, and with whom he has a daughter, Nathalie. His second wife was American actress Alexandra King, whom he married in 1984, and with whom he adopted two children, Nicholas and Charlotte. His third wife was Romanian fashion model Amalia Teodosescu, whom he married in 2004. They have two children, Alessia and Emma Alexandra. After they split in 2010, he married Romanian fashion model Brigitte Sfăt in 2013; their marriage ended in 2018. In 2019, he married Ioana Simion.

Maxim has placed Năstase at number 6 on its "Living Sex Legends" list, as he is reputed to have slept with over 2,500 women. Năstase's own estimate of 800 to 900 was too low for the writer of his biography who wanted a larger number to improve his reputation. After hearing this, his third wife, Amalia, said that she was happy to have conquered such a man. Năstase met Amalia at a Sting concert and married her in a Greek Orthodox ceremony on 5 June 2004, followed by a civil ceremony in July of the same year. They divorced in February 2010, after six years of marriage.

As he played for the Army's sports club Steaua, he was an employee of the Ministry of Defence..

On 25 May 2018, Năstase was arrested twice within a six-hour span for drunk-driving and riding a scooter through a red light.

He also was involved in an animation project, and provides the Romanian voice of the federal agent in the Disney movie “G-Force”.

During the second season of "Masked Singer România", Năstase appeared as "Bufnița" on 9 September 2021. He sang "My Way" by Frank Sinatra, unmasking himself before the audience vote for elimination.

Career statistics

Singles performance timeline

Qualifying matches and walkovers are neither official match wins nor losses.

 * including 57 pre-ATP and ATP titles
 ** including 749 – 287 (overall – 1036) listed by the ATP

Records
 These records were attained in the Open Era of tennis.

See also

 Tennis male players statistics

References

Further reading

External links

 
 
 
 
 

1946 births
Living people
French Open champions
Social Democratic Party (Romania) politicians
Conservative Party (Romania) politicians
National Union for the Progress of Romania politicians
Members of the Senate of Romania
Tennis players from Bucharest
Romanian sportsperson-politicians
Romanian male tennis players
International Tennis Hall of Fame inductees
US Open (tennis) champions
Grand Slam (tennis) champions in men's singles
Grand Slam (tennis) champions in mixed doubles
Grand Slam (tennis) champions in men's doubles
Romanian generals
ATP number 1 ranked singles tennis players
Presidents of the Romanian Tennis Federation